Accepted Eclectic is a studio album by American rapper Aceyalone. It was released on Ground Control and Project Blowed in 2001. It peaked at number 36 on the Billboard Independent Albums chart.

Critical reception
Steve Huey of AllMusic commented that "the shifting classical samples of the title track make it one of the best productions in his catalog." David M. Pecoraro of Pitchfork gave the album a 7.3 out of 10, saying, "Sure, it's often funny, and occasionally exciting, but ultimately, the attention to detail inherent in previous works has been marked absent. Shan Fowler of PopMatters named it one of the best albums of 2001.

Track listing

Charts

References

External links
 

2001 albums
Aceyalone albums
Albums produced by Evidence (musician)
Project Blowed